The GAZ-3308 "Sadko" is a Russian-built, 2.5-ton, 4-wheel-drive cargo truck. The Sadko is produced by the Gorky Automobile Plant (GAZ). It is named after Sadko, a protagonist in many bylinas of the Novgorod cycle.

Sadko has been replaced in production by the Sadko Next (Ru:САДКО NEXT).

History
The current GAZ-3308 series of vehicles served as a replacement for the GAZ-66, which was produced for approximately 35 years (from 1964 until 1999). The first prototype was developed by the Gorky Automobile Plant in 1995 under the designation GAZ-33097. Series production began in December, 1997, receiving the designation GAZ-3308 and the name "Sadko." In the Russian Army it replaced the GAZ-66-40 cab-over-engine truck. For this purpose certain modifications were implemented including the cab from the GAZ-3309 with fenders featuring enlarged wheel arches as well as drive axles and transmission analogous to those used on the GAZ-66-40.

Since 2003, most GAZ-3308 trucks have been equipped with a MMZ D-245.7 turbodiesel engine, which starting in 2005, met the requirements of the Euro-2 emission standard. In 2013, this engine was replaced by the type D-245.7E4 meeting the Euro-4 emission standard. 

In 2005 the GAZ-33086 "Zemlyak" variant was introduced; mainly differing in that it had a 4-wheel rear axle allowing for an increased 4-ton carrying capacity.

In 2013 another variant, the GAZ-33088, was introduced with a YaMZ-53442 turbodiesel engine meeting the Euro-4 emission standard. 

In June, 2014 GAZ presented a new version with the unofficial name of Sadko NEXT which had an increased carrying capacity of 3 tons, as well as a new version of GAZ-3309.

Major variants

GAZ-3308 - base model with a 130-horsepower carburetted engine ZMZ-5231.10 with 4.67 litre displacement.
GAZ-33081 - modified version with a 117-horsepower turbodiesel engine MMZ D-245.7 with 4.75 litre displacement.
GAZ-33082 - early version with a GAZ-562 turbodiesel engine produced under license from Steyr;
GAZ-33085 and GAZ-33086 (GAZ Zemlyak) with a payload capacity of 4 000 kg. This truck has inferior cross-country performance compared to the Sadko;
GAZ-33088 - modified version with a 134.5-horsepower YaMZ-53442 turbodiesel engine with 4.43 litre displacement.

Buses based on the "GAZ-3308" chassis

KAvZ-39766 - KAvZ-built all-terrain 19-seat bus utilising a KAvZ-3976 bus body. Modifications: 397660 - with the ZMZ-513 engine (modernized ZMZ-66), 397663 - with the MMZ D-245.7 engine. Produced in 2003–2005.
SemAR (Ru:СемАР)-3257 - all-terrain 12-seat bus utilising a Semar-3280 bus body. Equipped with the ZMZ-513 engine. Produced between 2001 and 2006.

Shift bus on the GAZ-3308 chassis - Utility "vahtovka" with a separate angular body placed behind the GAZ-3308 cab. Made between 2003 and 2006 by Semar. Currently manufactured by Auto Pro.

GAZ Vepr
The GAZ-330811-10 Вепрь Vepr (En:Wild Boar) is a special-purpose vehicle based on a shortened GAZ-3308 chassis with a 3- or 5-door all-metal body. Vepr retains all the advantages of a car but has the off-road capability of the Sadko.

Dimensions
Length: 6347 mm
Width: 2340 mm
Height: 2595 mm
Weight:
4150 kg (curb)
6450 kg (full)

Engines
ZMZ-5231
• Carbureted V-8
• Displacement: 4.67 l
• Power: 124 hp
• Torque: 298 Nm

MMZ D-245.7
• Turbodiesel I-4
• working volume - 4.75 l
• Power 117 hp
• torque of 382 Nm

MMZ D-245.7E3
• Turbodiesel I-4
• Displacement: 4.75 l
• Power: 119 hp
• Torque: 420 Nm

YaMZ-53442
• Turbodiesel I-4
• Displacement: 4.43 l
• Power: 134.5 hp
• Torque: 417 Nm

Engines are coupled to a 4- or 5-speed manual gearbox. A central tyre inflation system is standard.

Operators

 
 
 
 
  - GAZ-3308 was adopted as military truck for the Russian Armed Forces
  - 114 GAZ-3308 trucks were sold to Syrian Armed Forces in 2005
  - National Guard of Ukraine

References

External links

Sadko Test drive
GAZ Sadko page
Trucks Planet article
Military Today article

GAZ Group trucks
Pickup trucks
Vans
Military trucks
Military vehicles introduced in the 1990s